Jerome M. Eisenberg (July 6, 1930 – July 6, 2022) was an American dealer in antiquities. He had a son. Eisenberg died in July 2022 of pneumonia in a hospital in Manhattan, New York, at the age of 92.

Books
A Collector's Guide to Seashells of the World (McGraw-Hill, 1981)
Art of the Ancient World: A Guide for the Collector and Investor (1985)

References

External links
Jerome M. Eisenberg (The J. Paul Getty Museum Collection)

American art dealers
1930 births
2022 deaths
Deaths from pneumonia in New York (state)